Kellie Kiwi (born January 13, 1972) is a former female rugby union player. She represented  at the 1998 Women's Rugby World Cup. She was captain of the women's sevens team that won the 2004 Hong Kong Women's Sevens. Kiwi played for the Bay of Plenty.

References

External link
Black Ferns Profile

1972 births
Living people
New Zealand women's international rugby union players
New Zealand female rugby union players
Female rugby sevens players